Katarína Mravíková (born 28 December 1977 in Trenčín) is a retired Slovak handballer. She spent most of her career in Hungary, where she won a number of domestic league and cup titles. She also earned the EHF Cup title with Ferencváros in 2006.

Achievements 
Nemzeti Bajnokság I:
Winner: 2002, 2007, 2008, 2009, 2010, 2011
Silver Medallist: 2003, 2006
Bronze Medallist: 2004, 2005
Magyar Kupa:
Winner: 2003, 2008, 2009, 2010, 2011
Silver Medallist: 2007
EHF Champions League:
Finalist: 2002, 2009
Semifinalist: 2008, 2010, 2011
EHF Cup:
Winner: 2006
Semifinalist: 2005
EHF Cup Winners' Cup:
Semifinalist: 2007
EHF Champions Trophy:
Third Placed: 2002
Fourth Placed: 2006

References

External links 
 Katarína Mravíková career statistics on Worldhandball.com

1977 births
Living people
Sportspeople from Trenčín
Slovak female handball players
Expatriate handball players
Slovak expatriate sportspeople in Hungary
Győri Audi ETO KC players